MV Viking Sky is a cruise ship that was launched in 2016 and entered service in 2017. She is operated by Viking Ocean Cruises. On 23 March 2019, she suffered an engine failure off the coast of Norway. A partial evacuation by helicopters took place.

General characteristics
Her gross tonnage is 47,842, net tonnage 18,858, and deadweight tonnage 4,826tonnes. The ship's hull is strengthened for navigation in ice with Finnish-Swedish ice class 1C.

Viking Sky has 465 cabins for passengers, all outside with balconies. Amenities include two pools, a spa, a fitness center, two restaurants, several lounges and bars, a sports deck, a theatre, and various shops.

Like most modern cruise ships, Viking Sky has a diesel-electric propulsion system where an integrated power plant provides electricity for all onboard consumers ranging from the vessel's twin propellers to hotel functions such as lighting, air conditioning and electrical sockets in the passenger cabins. Her two interconnected but physically separated high-voltage switchboards are supplied by four alternators driven by MAN 32/44CR series medium-speed diesel engines.

In accordance with the Safe Return to Port requirements for passenger ships, the power plant is split to two engine rooms separated by watertight and fireproof bulkheads. In addition, Viking Sky has a single  Isotta Fraschini V1712T3 emergency diesel generator.

The ship's twin rudders feature Rolls-Royce's Promas system with streamlined propeller hubcaps and rudders that improve hydrodynamic performance. In addition, she has two  bow thrusters and a single  stern thruster for manoeuvering in ports.

Career

Construction
Viking Sky is one of a series of cruise ships built by Fincantieri in Ancona, Italy, for Viking Ocean Cruises. , she has five sister ships in operation (Viking Star, Viking Sea, Viking Sun, Viking Orion and Viking Jupiter), one under construction (Viking Venus), five on order (Viking Tellus and four yet unnamed vessels) and four more planned with deliveries spanning to 2027. Viking Sky was laid down on 20 December 2013, launched on 23 March 2016, and delivered on 26 January 2017. The ship was originally planned to set sail in 2016 as Viking Sea, but delivery was delayed until 2017. She was christened in June 2017 at Tromsø. Her port of registry is Bergen.

2019 incident

According to pilot(s) on board, the weather was well within the operational capability of the ship. There were 1,373 people on board – 915 passengers and 458 crew.

Around 13:50 in Hustadvika off the coast between Molde and Kristiansund, the ship's engines suffered loss of oil pressure, resulting in an automatic shutdown of all engines and she started drifting towards land. The alarms for low lubricant level did not trigger. Engines can only run without lubricant for a few minutes before being damaged. Rescue boats from shore had to return because of high seas. Anchors were dropped, and tugboats tried unsuccessfully to attach towlines to the ship.

Six of Norway's 14 rescue helicopters were sent to the scene and evacuated passengers. The crew of Viking Sky managed to restart one engine, but evacuation continued. "The ship only has one working engine and the winds are rather strong. Therefore we would prefer to have the passengers on land rather than on board the ship," police chief Tor Andre Franck said.

After about five hours, 100 passengers had been evacuated, with at least four helicopters involved in the airlift. "It will take time to evacuate everyone," Franck said.

Around 19:00, two helicopters were diverted to rescue the crew of the cargo ship , which had been going to the aid of Viking Sky and also suffered an engine failure. The Hagland crew bailed into the sea and were picked up by helicopters in the dark.

Sky's anchors were released (one pulled on board, one left behind) to move the ship further offshore. The concentration of Norwegian helicopters in the Hustadvika area caused rescue responsibility for Skagerrak to be transferred to Denmark and Sweden, and a Danish rescue helicopter was repositioned to Kristiansand in South Norway. Great Britain was ready to supply assistance if needed.

At 24:00 local time, roughly 170 passengers had been evacuated by helicopter. The ship was moving heavily in the storm with furniture sliding back and forth. On 24 March, after three of the four engines had been restarted during the night, evacuation was stopped at 9 Sunday morning, and Viking Sky got under way and headed for Molde. Four hundred and seventy-nine people had been airlifted off the ship during 30 helicopter trips. Sixteen people had been taken to hospital; three of them suffering serious injuries.

Viking Sky went to Molde under her own power but attached to a tug, as Sky's anchors were no longer operable, and reached Molde at 16:30 on 24 March. On 27 March she arrived at a shipyard in Kristiansund for repairs, and its next cruise was cancelled.

The Accident Investigation Board Norway has opened an investigation, including why the ship sailed despite storm warnings having been issued. The corresponding agencies of the United Kingdom and United States will participate. Norwegian police are conducting a separate inquiry and both Lloyd's Register of Shipping and the engine makers are involved onboard. On 27 March, a safety message was issued asking operators to check their lubricating oil systems, stating that the reason for the engine failure was that the lubricating oil pumps stopped running due to boat movement which caused problems with supply.

References

External links 

Map animation of March 2019 incident, by Vesseltracker (Genscape)

Ships built in Ancona
Ships built by Fincantieri
Cruise ships of Norway
2016 ships
Maritime incidents in 2019
2019 in Norway
March 2019 events in Europe